The Amarillo Wranglers were a minor professional ice hockey team in the Southwest Hockey League from 1975 to 1977.  This was the second Wranglers ice hockey team established in Amarillo, Texas;  the first being the Pittsburgh Penguins farm team described in a separate entry.

The Wranglers were established by Las Vegas businessman Ralph Engelstad, founder of the Southwest Hockey League.   The league model was unique in that it promoted the educational development of its players.   Players received a stipend of $60.00 per month, were provided with room and board, and were provided with tuition and fees to a local university or junior college.  Players not drafted by higher  leagues could complete their education.

The Wranglers wore orange, blue, and white jerseys modeled after the New York Islanders.

The Amarillo Wranglers were Southwest League Champions for the 1975-1976 season under Coach Cal Swenson.

The Wranglers underwent reorganization and briefly played as the Amarillo Lone Stars beginning in December 1976.  The Southwest Hockey League folded in January 1977.

In March 2013, the Wranglers held their 36th reunion in Amarillo, TX.  At the NAHL Amarillo Bulls final home game in 2013, the Wranglers were heralded as the city’s first hockey champions.  A banner is now on display in the Amarillo Civic Center commemorating the Wranglers’ championship season.

President - Bill O’Grady

Coach - Cal Swenson

Season record 
Note: GP = Games played, W = Wins, L = Losses, T = Ties, Pts = Points, GF = Goals for, GA = Goals against

Southwest Hockey League

Amarillo Wranglers all-time roster

References 

Sports in Amarillo, Texas
Defunct ice hockey teams in Texas
1975 establishments in Texas
1977 disestablishments in Texas
Ice hockey clubs established in 1975
Ice hockey clubs disestablished in 1977